The Arizona Thunder was a professional indoor soccer team based in Phoenix, Arizona.  In 1997, the team was a member of the Premier Soccer Alliance. In 1998, the alliance, with some additional teams, reconstituted itself as the World Indoor Soccer League (WISL). The Thunder continued to play in the WISL from 1998 to 2000. The team played in the Arizona Veterans Memorial Coliseum.

Many of the players grew up and played youth soccer in AZ including Randy Soderman, Rick Soderman, Jason Vanacour, Milo Iniguez, Mark Kerlin, Derick Brownell, Kenneth Wright (Thea), Sasha Hunter, Dave Cameron, along with many implants like Milos Tomic, Chris Scotti, and the Dunn Brothers.  Some games were televised on COX 9 In 1999 and in 2000.  During the Thunder's three years in the WISL they averaged attendance of 4,261 fans per game.

Year-by-year

Owner
John Ogden (Phoenix Power Soccer Club, Inc) 1998–2000

Notable players
 Randy Soderman
 Rick Soderman

References

Sports in Phoenix, Arizona
Defunct soccer clubs in Arizona
Soccer clubs in Arizona
World Indoor Soccer League teams
Premier Soccer Alliance teams
1998 establishments in Arizona
2000 disestablishments in Arizona
Association football clubs established in 1998
Association football clubs disestablished in 2000